Nicolette (full name Nicolette Love Suwoton, born 1964) is a Scottish singer-songwriter of Nigerian parentage, residing in London for most of her life, and has also lived in Nigeria, Switzerland, France, and Belgium.  Her music, although falling broadly into the field of electronica, is characterised by many influences, including, jazz, classical, blues, folk and African.

Career
She has released three solo albums, as well as a DJ mix album for the DJ-Kicks series, and featured on "Three" and "Sly", two songs on Massive Attack's 1994 Protection album. She has worked with many other collaborators in the electronic music field, including Plaid, Alec Empire, and 4hero.  She signed to the Talkin' Loud label in 1996. In 1999 she set up her own record label, Early Records, upon leaving Talkin’ Loud to release quirky pop anthems. According to Nicolette, Early Records' music policy is: "innovative pop music." Nicolette's 2005 album, Life Loves Us, was released through the label. One single and a 6-track EP were released from the album in the following year.

In 2007, Nicolette's "No Government" was re-released and remixed by DJ Tocadisco and Makossa & Megablast. In 2008, Nicolette contributed vocals to John Tejada's album Where, she sings and co-wrote the track "Desire". She released a single called "Love" with DJ Cam in March 2010. More recently she worked with Samuel Yirga on his album and released an EP. She also acted in Solveig Anspach's film "Queen of Montreuil". Her latest album "The Infinitive" is coming out in 2023.

Discography

Albums
Now Is Early (1992)
Let No-One Live Rent Free in Your Head (1996)
DJ-Kicks (1997)
 Life Loves Us (2005)
 Modern Stories EP  (2012)
The Infinitive (2023)

Non album tracks
 "I'm Raving" (with L.A. Style) 1993
 "Sly" (with Massive Attack) 1994
 "Three" (with Massive Attack) 1994
 "Extork" (with Plaid) 1997
 "Contradictions" (with Bang Gang) 2003
 "So Loud" (with Phui) 2007
 "Communication" (with Filewile) 2007
 "Desire" (with John Tejada) 2008
 "Love" (with DJ Cam) 2010
 "Birthday" (with TJ Kong and Nuno dos Santos) 2010
 "Something Happened" (with TJ Kong and Nuno dos Santos) 2010
 "I Am the Black Gold of the Sun" (with Samuel Yirga) 2012
 "African Diaspora" (with Samuel Yirga) 2012

References

External links 
 https://www.earlyintime.love
 

1964 births
Living people
21st-century Scottish women singers
20th-century Black British women singers
Musicians from Glasgow
British women in electronic music
British women DJs
Scottish people of Nigerian descent
20th-century Scottish women singers
Scottish electronic musicians
Trip hop musicians
Breakbeat musicians
Talkin' Loud artists
Scottish songwriters
Electronic dance music DJs